Arthfael Hen ap Rhys, also called Arthfael the Old, was the king of the Kingdom of Glywysing (in modern-day Wales) between 785 and approximately 825 AD.

History 
Arthfael was the second son of Gweirydd ap Brochfael and a descendant of Saint Tewdrig and Meurig ap Tewdrig of the Kingdom of Gwent as well as a descendant of Brychan. As such, he was a prince in both the kingdoms of Glywysing and Gwent as his cousin Athrwys was king of Gwent. He became King of Glywysing in 785 succeeding his father Rhys ap Ithael. He married the daughter of Braustud ferch Glowd of the Kingdom of Buellt, with whom he had two sons Rhys ap Arthfael and Meureg ap Arthfael. Despite this success, historians noted that the Kingdom of Glywysing at the time was subdivided between Arthfael's cousins, nephews and uncles. Each one of them were de facto monarchs over smaller parts of the Kingdom. While Arthfael was recognised as the senior king within the realm, it is unlikely that he had any direct control or authority over his competing ruling family members within the kingdom of Glywysing.

Death 

Arthfael died between 815 and 825 during a battle with the Anglo-Saxons near the church of Roath near Cardiff, though his army eventually won the battle. Arthfael was later buried in that church in Roath. He was succeeded as king of Glywysing by his son Rhys ap Arthfael. In 848, the King of Gwent and Arthfael's cousin Ithael ap Athrwys died and was succeeded by Meureg ap Arthfael and the two sons of Arthfael ruled both kingdoms together.

References 

Monarchs of Glywysing
8th-century Welsh monarchs
9th-century Welsh monarchs